Love Zone is the sixth studio album by British R&B singer and songwriter Billy Ocean, released in April 1986 through Jive Records. Three singles were released from the album including Ocean's second US No. 1 hit "There'll Be Sad Songs (To Make You Cry)" and the US top ten hit "Love Zone". It also features the UK No. 1 and US No. 2 single "When the Going Gets Tough, the Tough Get Going", which had originally been released as a single from the soundtrack to the 1985 film The Jewel of the Nile.

A critical and commercial success, it became his highest charting album in both the UK and the US, where it peaked at number two and number six respectively, and was certified double platinum by the Recording Industry Association of America (RIAA) for shipments of over 2 million copies.

Critical reception

Love Zone received favourable reviews from critics. People magazine noted that "Ocean just floats along on this smooth" album and that "the moods [he] creates are so richly romantic they shouldn’t be inflicted on the brokenhearted".

The album received a Grammy nomination in the category of Best Male R&B Vocal Performance. Ocean also won two American Music Awards, including for Favorite Pop/Rock Single.

Track listing

Charts

Weekly charts

Year-end charts

Certifications

Production and artwork
 Executive producer on track 1 – Robert John "Mutt" Lange
 Producers – Barry J. Eastmond and Wayne Brathwaite
 Engineers – Steve Power (1-7 & 9); Bryan "Chuck" New (Track 8)
 Mixing – Nigel Green (Tracks 1, 3, 4, 5, 8 & 9); Bryan "Chuck" New (Tracks 2, 6 & 7)
 Cover photography – Rob Lee

See also
List of Billboard number-one R&B albums of 1986

References

External links

1986 albums
Billy Ocean albums
Pop rock albums by English artists
Jive Records albums
Albums recorded at Morgan Sound Studios